Diaries of an Internet Lover is a book by television presenter and journalist Dawn Porter.

Porter places an ad on a website and the book highlights the email exchange leading up to each date.  There is then an in depth tale for each of the guys (and girls) she met.

It was published by Virgin Books on 9 February 2006 and is 256 pages long.

References

2006 books